The Black Current was a Volkswagen Beetle, rebuilt with an electric motor.

This car's main purpose was to be used as a drag racer. 

In 2011, the vehicle reached a  time in 1.6 seconds.
Electric vehicle conversion
Volkswagen Beetle